Astrid Heidecke (born 14 September 1959) is a German footballer. She played in one match for the Germany national team in 1984.

Career 
Heidecke joined the women's team of the athletic ball game club founded in 1977 in the municipality of Wesseln in the district of Dithmarschen in Schleswig-Holstein.

In the course of her goalkeeping career, she made several appearances in the selection team of the Schleswig-Holstein Football Association. She even made her debut in the senior national team. In her only international match on November 21, 1984, in Waalwijk in a 1–1 draw in a friendly against the national team of the Netherlands, she came on as a substitute in the second half for Marion Isbert when the score was 0–1.

References

External links
 
 Astrid Heidecke in the soccerdonna.de database
 Astrid Heidecke in the database of the German Football Association

1959 births
Living people
German women's footballers
Germany women's international footballers
Place of birth missing (living people)
Association football goalkeepers
Women's association football goalkeepers